John Chesser (1819-1892) was a nineteenth-century Scottish architect largely based in Edinburgh. He was described as "the prime exponent of terrace design at the time". A very high number of his works are now category A listed buildings, evidencing the quality of his work, particularly in the West End of Edinburgh.

Life

He was born on 18 September 1819 on the Dalmeny House estate, a few miles west of Edinburgh, his elderly father, William Chesser (1757-1849), being Clerk of Works there.

After spending some years working on the Revesby House estate in Lincolnshire he returned to Dalmeny to fill his father’s shoes on his death.

By 1852 he appears to have been working for the City Architect, David Cousin.

Through his experience, in 1858, he then gained a post as Superintendent of Works at George Heriot’s School following the death of Alexander Black. This role included developing the huge swathes of land around the city owned by the Heriot Trust, particularly in the West End of Edinburgh, and also building ten Heriot Trust Schools around the city for the less privileged children to attend.

He lived most of his later life at 1 Chalmers Street in southern Edinburgh.

He died in Corstorphine, Edinburgh on 2 February 1892 and is buried in Cramond Kirkyard. His father William, mother Margaret Bell (d.1829), wife Ann Stennett (1827-1900) and numerous children (most of whom died young) lie with him.
 
His son John William Chesser (1862-1921) grew to adulthood and became Lord Provost of Edinburgh, 1919-1921. He is buried with a separate monument, immediately to the north.

Works

Chesser was particularly prevalent at tenemental streets and terraced houses so much of his work is entire streets and areas rather than individual buildings. All works are in Edinburgh unless otherwise noted.

Lennox Street (c.1860) originally called Leuchars Street - completed the scheme begun by John Tait and done for the Heriot Trust.
2-24 East Claremont Street (1860)
Bellevue Place (1860)
Buckingham Terrace (1860)
Howard Place, St Andrews, Fife (1860)
Hope Park estate St Andrews, Fife (1864)
Clifton Terrace (1865)
Belgrave Crescent (1865)
Rosebery Crescent (1865)
Magdala Crescent and Mews (1869)
Grosvenor Crescent (1869)
South-east quarter of St Mary Street Improvement Plan
Coates Gardens (1871) odd numbers
36-48 Palmerston Place (1872)
Learmonth Terrace (1873) (works completed by McGibbon & Ross)
Eglinton Crescent (1873)
Glencairn Crescent (1873)
Huge Leith Walk scheme (from Smiths Place to Brunswick Street.. the whole east side, plus all side streets: Lorne St/Halmyre St/Dalmeny St/Albert St stretching to Easter Road) (1873–96)
Belgrave Crescent (1874)
Douglas Crescent (1875)
Coates Gardens (1875) even numbers
Southfield House (1875)
54-62 Palmerston Place (1877)
Completion of the Calton scheme at Hillside Crescent/Windsor Street/ Hillside Street/ Wellington Street/Brunton Place (1883-1896)

George Heriot Trust Schools

These were all built on Trust land and using Trust monies. They all largely borrow architectural details from their mother school.

Regent Road (Montrose Terrace) (1874)
St Bernard’s Crescent (1874)
Dean Street (1874)

References

Further reading
Buildings of Scotland: Edinburgh, by McWilliam, Gifford and Walker
Dictionary of Scottish Architects: John Chesser

1819 births
1892 deaths
19th-century Scottish architects
Architects from Edinburgh